Alvin and the Chipmunks, originally David Seville and the Chipmunks or simply The Chipmunks, are an American animated virtual band and media franchise first created by Ross Bagdasarian for novelty records in 1958. The group consists of three singing animated anthropomorphic chipmunks named Alvin, Simon, and Theodore who are originally managed by their human adoptive father, David "Dave" Seville.

Bagdasarian provided the group's voices by producing sped-up recordings of his own, a technique pioneered on the successful "Witch Doctor". Later in 1958, Bagdasarian released the similarly-engineered "The Chipmunk Song" for which he came up with the chipmunk characters and their human father, attributing the track to them. David Seville and the Chipmunks released several more records over the following decade until Bagdasarian's death in 1972. The franchise was revived in 1979 with the characters' voices provided by his son Ross Bagdasarian Jr. and the latter's wife Janice Karman. 

Through the successful franchise, the Chipmunks have become one of the most successful children's artists of all time. It has garnered two number-one singles on the Billboard Hot 100 and won five Grammy Awards, having four Top 10 albums on the Billboard 200 and three certified platinum albums. "The Chipmunk Song" became one of the best-selling singles of all time at 5 million physical copies sold.

The Chipmunks were first depicted in animated form in The Alvin Show (1961). The characters have since featured in several television series and films, as well as other media. In 2019, The Chipmunks received a star on the Hollywood Walk of Fame.

History

"Witch Doctor" 

In 1958, Ross Bagdasarian Sr. released a novelty song (as David Seville) about being unsuccessful at love until he found a witch doctor who told him how to woo his woman. The song was done by Bagdasarian in his normal voice, except for the "magic" words, done first in Bagdasarian's pitched-up, pre-Chipmunk voice, then in a duet between his pitched-up voice and his normal voice. The words themselves are nonsense: "Oo-ee, oo-ah-ah, ting-tang, walla-walla, bing-bang".

The song was a hit, holding number one for three weeks in the Billboard Top 100 chart. Nothing makes any reference to chipmunks, but the song is sometimes included on Chipmunk compilations as if the Chipmunks had provided the voice of the Witch Doctor. Bagdasarian did record a Chipmunks version of "Witch Doctor", which appeared on the second Chipmunks album, Sing Again with the Chipmunks, in 1960. Bagdasarian performed the song "live" (with a pre-recorded track of the pitched-up voice) on The Ed Sullivan Show.

Bagdasarian (again as Seville) recorded a follow-up song, "The Bird on My Head", singing a duet with his own sped-up voice as the bird. It also reached the Top 40, peaking at No. 34. While driving in Sequoia National Park, Bagdasarian saw a chipmunk dash in front of him. That moment inspired him to create his chipmunk characters.

The technique was imitated by Sheb Wooley's "The Purple People Eater" and The Big Bopper's "The Purple People Eater Meets the Witch Doctor".

"The Chipmunk Song" 

After the success of "Witch Doctor", Liberty Records asked Bagdasarian to create another successful novelty record. He then came up with three singing chipmunks who were named, as an inside joke, after executives at Liberty Records. Alvin (named after Al Bennett), Simon (named after Si Waronker), and Theodore (Ted Keep).

The Chipmunks first officially appeared on the scene in a novelty record released in late fall 1958 by Bagdasarian. The song, originally listed on the record label (Liberty F-55168) as "The Chipmunk Song (Christmas Don't Be Late)", featured the singing skills of the chipmunk trio. One phrase in the chorus has Alvin wishing for a hula hoop, which was that year's hot new toy. The novelty record was highly successful, selling more than 4 million copies in seven weeks, and it launched the careers of its chipmunk stars. It spent four weeks at Number 1 on the Billboard Hot 100 chart from December 22, 1958, to January 12, 1959, succeeding "To Know Him Is to Love Him" at Number 1 on the same chart by the Teddy Bears, a pop group that featured Phil Spector. It also earned three Grammy Awards and a nomination for Record of the Year. At the height of its popularity, Bagdasarian and three chipmunk hand-puppets appeared on The Ed Sullivan Show, lip-synching the song. "The Chipmunk Song" appeared on the Chipmunks' debut album, Let's All Sing with the Chipmunks, in 1959, and was repeated on Christmas with the Chipmunks, released in 1962. The song also has been included on several compilation albums.

Bob Rivers did a parody of this song for his 2000 Christmas album Chipmunks Roasting on an Open Fire which was titled "The Twisted Chipmunk Song". In the song, the Chipmunks are referred to as Thagadore (Theodore), Squeaky (Simon), and Melvin (Alvin S).

The Three Chipmunks (1959) 
The Chipmunks first appeared in comic book form on Dell Comics' Four Color Comics series, issue #1042 (cover-dated Dec. 1959). Alvin, Theodore and Simon were depicted as somewhat realistic, nearly identical anthropomorphic rodents with almond-shaped eyes. When Herb Klynn's Format Films made a deal to develop the Three Chipmunks for animation, the old designs were rejected and new versions of the characters were created. Liberty Records eventually re-issued the early albums with the "new" Chipmunks and it was this new version of the Chipmunks that was used when Alvin's own title was released by Dell in 1962.

The Alvin Show (1961–62) 

The first television series to feature the characters was The Alvin Show. By this period, the Chipmunks looked much like their modern incarnations. Also, an animated portrayal of Seville was a reasonable caricature of Bagdasarian himself. The series ran from 1961 to 1962 and was one of a small number of animated series to be shown in prime time on CBS. It was not a prime-time ratings success and was subsequently canceled after one season. Ratings improved significantly in syndication.

In addition to Alvin cartoons, the series also featured the scientist Clyde Crashcup and his assistant Leonardo. Those characters did not feature prominently on any of the later series. Crashcup made a single cameo appearance in A Chipmunk Christmas, and in an episode of the 1983 TV series. The television series was produced by Format Films for Bagdasarian Film Corporation. Although the series was broadcast in black and white, it was produced and later re-run in color. Twenty-six episodes each were produced for the "Alvin and the Chipmunks" and "Clyde Crashcup" segments, along with 52 musical segments.

New albums and A Chipmunk Christmas (1969–82)
The final Chipmunks album in the project's original incarnation, The Chipmunks Go to the Movies, was released in 1969. After the death of Ross Bagdasarian in 1972 from a heart attack, the Chipmunks' careers stalled until NBC showed interest in the original show (the network carried Saturday morning reruns of The Alvin Show as a midseason replacement in 1979) and the following year, Excelsior Records released a new album of contemporary songs performed by the Chipmunks. That album, Chipmunk Punk, featured Bagdasarian's son, Ross Bagdasarian Jr., doing the voices of the characters. That album and the continued reruns of the series proved to be popular enough to warrant further new records as well as new television productions, and in 1981, the Chipmunks and Seville returned to television in the Christmas special A Chipmunk Christmas, produced by Filmation, which was first broadcast on NBC on December 14 of that year. Next year, two more albums were released (Chipmunk Rock and The Chipmunks Go Hollywood).

Alvin and the Chipmunks (1983–90)

The group's name changed from "the Chipmunks" to "Alvin and the Chipmunks".

In 1983, a second animated television series for the group, produced by Ruby-Spears Productions, was released. Titled simply Alvin and the Chipmunks, the outline of the show closely paralleled the original Alvin Show. The series lasted eight production seasons until 1990. The first season introduced the Chipettes (three female versions of the Chipmunks): Brittany, Jeanette, and Eleanor with their human guardian, the myopic Miss Beatrice Miller (who arrived for the 1986 season). The show's success led to the release of a soundtrack album in 1984, Songs from Our TV Shows.

After 1988, the show was renamed just The Chipmunks to indicate that there were now two groups of them. Also introduced was the boys' "Uncle" Harry, who may or may not have been a relative. The show reflected contemporaneous trends in popular culture; the Chipmunks sang recent hits, and wore contemporary clothing. One "documentary" episode spoofed John Lennon's 1966 infamous comment that the Beatles had become "more popular than Jesus", by recalling how the Chipmunks had fallen in popularity after Alvin boasted they were "bigger than Mickey Mouse!". In 1985, the Chipmunks, along with the Chipettes, were featured in the live stage show, Alvin and the Chipmunks and the Amazing Computer. In 1987, during the fifth season of the television show, the Chipmunks had their first animated feature film, The Chipmunk Adventure, directed by Janice Karman and Ross Bagdasarian Jr. and released to theaters by The Samuel Goldwyn Company. The film featured the Chipmunks and the Chipettes in a contest traveling around the world.

In the 1988–89 season, the show switched production companies to DIC Entertainment (1988-1990) and Murakami Wolf Swenson (1988), by which time the Chipmunks had truly become anthropomorphized. In 1990, the show switched titles again to The Chipmunks Go to the Movies. Each episode in this season was a spoof of a Hollywood film, such as Back to the Future, King Kong, and others. In addition, several television specials featuring the characters were also released. After the eighth season, the show was canceled again. In 1990, a documentary was produced about the show entitled Alvin and the Chipmunks/Five Decades with the Chipmunks. In that year, the Chipmunks also teamed up for the only time with other famous cartoon stars (such as Bugs Bunny, Garfield, etc.) for the drug abuse-prevention special Cartoon All-Stars to the Rescue.

Music releases and short-lived Universal acquisition (1991–2002) 
On January 18, 1991, NBC aired a television special starring the Chipmunks entitled Rockin' Through the Decades. The same year, the band released the album The Chipmunks Rock the House. In 1992, the group released the country album Chipmunks in Low Places. Released on September 29, 1992, the album was certified platinum by the RIAA, becoming the group's first platinum record and making it the Chipmunks' best-selling album followed by a greatest hits release and a reissue of 1981's A Chipmunk Christmas. By 1993, Urban Chipmunk was re-released as a compilation album The Chipmunks' 35th Birthday Party with a double album, called The Chipmunks Sing-Alongs.

Their fourth Christmas album, A Very Merry Chipmunk, saw a release in 1994, then When You Wish Upon a Chipmunk in 1995, and Club Chipmunk: The Dance Mixes in 1996 which peaked in the Top 10 on Billboard's Top Kid Audio.

In 1996, Universal Studios purchased the rights to the characters. In 1998, Sony Wonder and Columbia Records released The A-Files: Alien Songs and Greatest Hits: Still Squeaky After All These Years on September 21, 1999. The purchase of the rights to the characters by Universal resulted in the Chipmunks' 1999 reappearance, in the form of the direct-to-video movie Alvin and the Chipmunks Meet Frankenstein, released on September 28, 1999. Five new songs were composed for the film were made available via a soundtrack released by MCA Records. Later that year, The Chipmunks' Greatest Christmas Hits was released.

The movie was successful enough to spark interest in a sequel, and in 2000, Alvin and the Chipmunks Meet the Wolfman appeared. Three new songs were composed for the film, that were also made available on a soundtrack by MCA.

Both movies featured the original cast of the second series reprising their roles as the tone was very similar to the series. Universal lost the rights to the characters in 2002 due to a breach of contract with Bagdasarian Productions.

Return to independency, movies and merchandise (2003–2021) 
On September 17, 2004, Fox 2000 Pictures, Regency Enterprises, and Bagdasarian Productions announced a live-action hybrid film starring Alvin and the Chipmunks. Tim Hill directed the 2007 CGI/live-action film adaptation, with Justin Long, Matthew Gray Gubler, and Jesse McCartney providing the voices, along with its 2009, 2011, and 2015 sequels. Bagdasarian Jr. and Karman continue to perform the singing voices for Alvin, Theodore, and the Chipettes, but Steve Vining did Simon's singing voice. The projects have earned five Grammy awards, an American Music Award, a Golden Reel Award, three Kids' Choice Awards, and Emmy nominations.

Possible acquisition (2021–present) 
In 2021, the franchise was announced to be sold to a potential buyer. With Paramount Global reportedly being interested. As of November 2022, updates on the acquisition have not been publicly announced.

Main characters

Dave Seville

The Chipmunks
In the 1980s media, the boys are triplets, as they celebrate their birthday together in "A Chipmunk Reunion" (Alvin stating to be born five minutes before Simon), and they are about 8–9 years. The 1983 series revealed that the boys' mother "Vinnie" is a similarly anthropomorphic chipmunk living in a nearby forest. One year a particularly harsh winter had caused a nut shortage. Vinnie realized that her newborn children would likely not survive the winter, so she anonymously left them on Dave's doorstep. She returned briefly to see what happened years later. Dave and the boys were unaware of their origins until they asked him during an argument over the exact date of their birthday. Vinnie had never revealed herself to him, but the boys investigated and eventually tracked her down.

While never mentioned, in the CGI movies and 2015 series, the chipmunks are no longer triplets and celebrate different birthdays; but seem to be around the same school age. In the 2007 feature film, the chipmunks lived in a tree, fending for themselves as their parents had taken off to join a hippie commune and had problems gathering nuts for the winter. Their tree is cut down and carted off to grace the entrance lobby of a city office building, with them in it. They eventually wind up in Dave's home, where they wreak havoc.  After being thrown out, Dave notices how well they can sing, making them famous. They eventually win his heart.

Personnel
Alvin Seville – lead and backing vocals
Simon Seville – lead and backing vocals
Theodore Seville – lead and backing vocals

Recording technique

The Chipmunks' voices were recorded at half the normal tape speed on audiotape by voice talent (on the 1960s records, generally Ross Bagdasarian Sr.'s own voice overdubbed three times, on the post-1980s records, studio singers) talking or singing at half the normal speaking rate. When the tape was played back at normal speed, they would sound a full octave higher in pitch, at normal tempo. The technique was by no means new to the Chipmunks. For example, the high- and low-pitched characters in The Wizard of Oz were achieved by speeding up and slowing down vocal recordings. Also, Mel Blanc's voice characterization for Daffy Duck was Sylvester the Cat's voice sped up to some extent. Now, the same effect is created digitally and in real-time with a pitch shift.

However, the extensive use of this technique with the Chipmunks, coupled with their popularity, linked this technique to them. The term "chipmunk-voiced" has entered the American vernacular to describe any artificially high-pitched voice. A similar effect could be obtained in playback by merely taking an LP recorded at 33 RPM and playing it back at 45 or 78 RPM, a trick sometimes tried out by ordinary record listeners. The instrumental portions of the song are sped up as well, however, making it obvious that the music is being played at the wrong speed. Bagdasarian recorded vocals and music at different speeds to combine properly on his recording. Guitarist Les Paul said he visited Bagdasarian's studio in 1958 and helped with the recording.

The technique was used extensively in the British puppet show Pinky and Perky, which predated the Chipmunks. The sound was frequently imitated in comedy records, notably "Transistor Radio" by Benny Hill, "Bridget the Midget" by Ray Stevens, "The Laughing Gnome" by David Bowie, and on several tracks on Joe Meek and the Blue Men's album I Hear a New World. The technique also appears in the "Yeah! You!" line of the Coasters' song "Charlie Brown". Prince used the technique on several of his songs, as well as Frank Zappa on We're Only in It for the Money and on the instrumental album Hot Rats, among others. The early production style of hip-hop artist Kanye West involved sped-up, high-pitch vocal samples from classic soul records incorporated with his own (additional) instrumentation. Due in part to the acclaim of his debut album The College Dropout, such sampling techniques subsequently became much copied by a myriad of other hip-hop producers. In the early 1990s rave scene, many breakbeat hardcore productions would utilize the same studio tricks, often taking a cappella from house records and speeding them up to fit the faster tempo. Vocals in songs that used this method would typically be referred to as "chipmunk vocals".

Guest appearances
The Chipmunks made their first guest appearance on The Ed Sullivan Show on December 13, 1959, when they performed "The Chipmunk Song".

In 1968, the Chipmunks appeared in an Italian commercial TV program Carosello, in their sponsorship of Prealpi, a cheese-maker in Varese, Italy.

The Chipmunks appeared in the Macy's Thanksgiving Day Parade twice; 1983 and 1986. In the 1983 parade, they performed Tomorrow. In 1986, they performed The Girls of Rock and Roll with The Chipettes as a way to promote their film, The Chipmunk Adventure, which was released six months later.

The Chipmunks performed with Canned Heat on the band's interpretation of "The Chipmunk Song", which is sufficiently derivative of the Chipmunk's 1958 hit that Ross Bagdasarian Sr. gets sole writing credit. It was featured as the flip-side of the band's Christmas Blues single released in late 2009.

The Chipmunks made a guest appearance on Xuxa in 1993, where they performed "Country Pride" from their album, Chipmunks in Low Places.

They also appeared on the FOX NFL Sunday intro (which premiered on December 20, 2009) with the cameo character, Digger (the mascot for NASCAR on Fox).

The Chipmunks made an appearance at a Los Angeles Dodgers preseason game on April 3, 2010, when the Dodgers squared off against their rivals, the Los Angeles Angels. The group performed, "America the Beautiful" with a group of children prior to the game. Also, Simon Seville wore a wig of Manny Ramirez's dreadlocks. Ross Bagdasarian Jr. made the opening ceremonial pitch for that game.

The Chipmunks made multiple appearances on ads for Food Safety to help kids learn safe food practices.

Video games
 The Chipmunks (1990) – platforms: Tiger Electronic Game.
 Alvin and the Chipmunks (2007) – platforms: Nintendo DS, Wii, PlayStation 2 and Microsoft Windows.
 Alvin and the Chipmunks: The Squeakquel (2009) – platforms: Nintendo DS and Wii.
 Alvin and the Chipmunks: Chipwrecked (2011) – arranger: Eleonora Rossin - platforms: Nintendo DS, Wii and Xbox 360.

Concert tours
 1984:The Chipmunks and the Magic Camera (The Chipmunks)
 1985: Alvin and the Chipmunks and the Amazing Computer (The Chipmunks and the Chipettes)
 2008: Get Munk'd Tour (The Chipmunks)
 2015: Alvin and the Chipmunks: The Musical (The Chipmunks and the Chipettes)

Awards and nominations
 1959, won three Grammy Awards for Best Recording for Children, Best Comedy Performance and Best Engineered Record –Non-Classical for the song "The Chipmunk Song" (it was also nominated for Record of the Year, but did not win).
 1960, won a Grammy Award for Best Engineered Recording -Non-Classical for the song "Alvin's Harmonica."
 1961, won a Grammy Award for Best Album for Children for the album Let's All Sing with the Chipmunks (it was also nominated for Best Engineered Record -Non-Classical). The song "Alvin for President" was also nominated for both Best Comedy Performance –Musical and Best Engineered Record –Novelty, making two nominations in the latter category.
 1962, was nominated again for a Grammy Award for Best Engineered Record –Novelty for the television tie-in album The Alvin Show.
 1963, was nominated again for Grammy Awards for both Best Album for Children and Best Engineered Record –Novelty for the album The Chipmunk Songbook.
 1966, was nominated for a Grammy Award for Best Recording for Children for the song "Supercalifragilisticexpialidocious".
 1985, was nominated for an Emmy Award in the category "Outstanding Animated Program (Daytime)."
 1987, the second television series was nominated for a Young Artist Award in the category "Exceptional Family Animation Series or Specials."
 1987, was nominated for an Emmy Award in the category "Outstanding Animated Program (Daytime)."
 1988, was nominated for an Emmy Award in the category "Outstanding Animated Program (Daytime)."
 1988, was nominated for a Young Artist Award in the category "Best Motion Picture –Animation" for the movie The Chipmunk Adventure.
 2000, won the Golden Reel Award in the category "Best Sound Editing –Direct to Video – Sound Editorial" for the movie Alvin and the Chipmunks Meet Frankenstein.
 2008, Jason Lee won the Kids' Choice Awards in the category "Favorite Movie" for the movie Alvin and the Chipmunks.
 2008, the 2007 Alvin and the Chipmunks soundtrack won the American Music Award for "Best Movie Soundtrack."
 2010, Alvin and the Chipmunks: The Squeakquel won the Kids' Choice Awards in the category "Favorite Movie."
 2012, Alvin and the Chipmunks: Chipwrecked won the 2012 Kids' Choice Awards in the category "Favorite Movie."
 2019, earned a star on the Hollywood Walk of Fame.

There were five Grammy Awards, an American Music Award, a Golden Reel Award, three Kids Choice Awards in total, and a star on the Hollywood Walk of Fame.

References

External links

 Chipmunks.com, Bagdasarian Productions' official site
 
 Cinema.ch Trailer
 "The History of the Chipmunks", Animation.Archive.org
 Alvin and the Chipmunks" at Don Markstein's Toonopedia. Archived from the original on April 4, 2012.
 
 

1958 establishments in the United States
 
American children's musical groups
American novelty song performers
Animated musical groups
American animation studios
Anthropomorphic rodents
Atlantic Records artists
Capitol Records artists
Child musical groups
Columbia Records artists
Decca Records artists
Family musical groups
Fictional musical groups
Fictional adoptees
Fictional characters introduced in 1958
Fictional chipmunks
Fictional musicians
Fictional singers
Fictional trios
Grammy Award winners
Hollywood Records artists
Liberty Records artists
Child characters in animated films
Child characters in animated television series
Child characters in film
American companies established in 1961
1961 establishments in California
Companies based in Santa Barbara County, California
Child characters in television
Teenage characters in film
Animated television series about children
MCA Records artists
Musical groups established in 1958
American parodists
Parody musicians
RCA Records artists
Fictional characters invented for recorded music
Video game musicians
Mass media franchises introduced in 1958